Adkar Maruti (born 15 February 1950) is an Indian former wrestler who competed in the 1972 Summer Olympics.

References

External links
 

1950 births
Living people
Olympic wrestlers of India
Wrestlers at the 1972 Summer Olympics
Indian male sport wrestlers
Place of birth missing (living people)